Rodney K. Mazion (born February 4, 1971) is a former American football defensive back who played five seasons in the Arena Football League with the Las Vegas Sting/Anaheim Piranhas and Milwaukee Mustangs. He played college football and baseball at the University of Nevada, Las Vegas. He attended Hillsborough High School in Tampa, Florida. Mazion was drafted by the Seattle Mariners in the 48th round of the 1990 MLB June Amateur Draft out of Hillsborough High School. He was again drafted by the New York Mets in the 15th round of the 1993 MLB June Amateur Draft out of the University of Nevada, Las Vegas. He played for the Pittsfield Mets of the New York Mets organization in 1993.

References

External links
Just Sports Stats
College stats

Living people
1971 births
Players of American football from Tampa, Florida
American football wide receivers
American football defensive backs
African-American players of American football
UNLV Rebels football players
Las Vegas Sting players
Anaheim Piranhas players
Milwaukee Mustangs (1994–2001) players
Pittsfield Mets players
21st-century African-American sportspeople
20th-century African-American sportspeople